The 1920 United States presidential election in Alabama took place on November 2, 1920, as part of the 1920 general election, in which all 48 states participated. Alabama voters chose twelve electors to represent them in the Electoral College via popular vote pitting Democratic nominee James M. Cox and his running mate, Assistant Secretary of the Navy Franklin Roosevelt, against Republican challenger U.S. Senator Warren G. Harding and his running mate, Governor Calvin Coolidge.

Cox won the election in Alabama with 67.31% of the vote. Harding received 31.37% of the vote. Nonetheless, Harding managed to carry nine counties as against only Union holdout Winston County, Populist stronghold Chilton County and urbanized Shelby County carried by Hughes in 1916, with his most notable triumph being in DeKalb County, where he was the first-ever Republican victor.

Results

Results by county

See also
United States presidential elections in Alabama

Notes

References

1920
Alabama
1920 Alabama elections